In mathematics, more specifically in functional analysis, a K-space is an F-space  such that every extension of F-spaces (or twisted sum) of the form

is equivalent to the trivial one

where  is the real line.

Examples

N. J. Kalton and N. P. Roberts proved that the Banach space  is not a K-space.

See also

References

Functional analysis
F-spaces
Topological vector spaces